Victor Tatin (1843–1913) was a French engineer who created an early airplane, the Aéroplane, in 1879. The craft was the first model airplane to take off using its own power after a run on the ground.

It had twin propellers and was powered by a compressed-air engine. It was flown tethered to a central pole on a circular track at the military facilities of Chalais-Meudon. Running under its own power it took off at a speed of 8 metres per second.

In 1902-3 he collaborated with Maurice Mallet on the construction of the dirigible Ville de Paris for Henri Deutsch de la Meurthe and in 1905 he designed the propeller used by Traian Vuia for his experimental aircraft of 1906-7. In 1908 Tatin designed an unsuccessful pusher monoplane which was exhibited at the 1908 Paris Aéro Salon. In 1911 he collaborated with Louis Paulhan on the design of the Aéro-Torpille, a monoplane with a remarkably streamlined design.

Works
 Victor Tatin, Elements d'aviation (Paris: Dunod et Pinet, 1908).

See also
Early flying machines

Notes

External links

 The Pioneers: Victor Tatin

19th-century French inventors
Aviation inventors
1913 deaths
1843 births
Chevaliers of the Légion d'honneur
People from Paris